A famous recorded oral tradition among Muslims (Arabic: Hadith) is about comment made by Imran ibn Husain, one of the companions of Muhammad and a Narrator of hadith. The comment was regarding the prohibition of Mut'ah, a word with several meanings. It is used in both Nikah mut'ah and Mut'ah of Hajj.

Although the narration is prominently quoted and referred to, it is not given any formal name, in contrast to other hadith such as the Hadith of the pond of Khumm or the Hadith of Qur'an and Sunnah

Narration

A hadith in Sahih Bukhari state: 

Another hadith under the topic of Hajj states:

The hadith recorded from him in Sahih Muslim states:

Another recorded by Sahih Muslim states:

Muslim view
Muslims view this hadith as notable since it can be seen as related to the Hadiths regarding the legality of Nikah Mut'ah, and is often mentioned when discussing those topics.

The comment of Imran ibn Husain is regarding the Hadith of Umar's speech of forbidding Mut'ah.

All Muslims agree that this hadith is authentic, and that Umar did indeed forbid Mut'ah. However, there is dispute on how to define "Mut'ah" and whether or not it was forbidden before Umar. 
The hadith tells about a "Verse of Mut'ah" revealed in the Qur'an. Muslims disagree which verse is alluded to, since two different verses can be seen as the Verse of Mut'ah.

The first one is found in Sura An-Nisa, verse 24. We read:

The word "istamta´tum" is notable, because the word used literally means "to benefit, to enjoy, to profit". Muslims differ on what is meant by Mut'ah here, and which judgement the verse gives about it. Generally, Shi'a Muslims tend to believe that Mut'ah here refers to the temporary marriage, and that this verse permits it. Among the Sunnis, different view exists:
Some sunnis do not believe that this verse refers to the Nikah Mut'ah at all. This view was favored by Suyuti.
Some agree that the verse refers to the temporary marriage, but disagree that the verse permits it. Ibn Kathir cited the hadith from Mujahid ibn Jabr to this effect.

The second possibility is that "The Verse of Mut'ah" refers to Al-Baqarah, 196. We read:

The phrase "...whoever profits by combining the visit with the pilgrimage" is notable, because the Arabic word used here is tamattu`, which literally means "to do Mut'ah". All Muslims agree that this verse refers to the Mut'ah of Hajj.

Sunni view
Sunnis considered this hadith as Sahih and it is found in the first and second of their Six major Hadith collections, the Two Sahihs, both believed by Sunnis to contain only authentic hadith (Arabic: sahih). In both of them, it is included among the chapters of the Hajj related subjects.

 comments in his Book Sahih Muslim:

A Sunni tafsir includes:

Some Sunni commentators of hadith have put Imran ibn Husain among the Salaf in favor of Nikah Mut'ah after Muhammad, based on this narration.

However, the major Sunni opinion is that this hadith actually refers to the Mut'ah of Hajj. Sunni Muslims believe that this view is strengthened by the fact that in both Sahih's, the hadith is included under Hajj-related topics. , the author of the commentary of Sahih Muslim supports the view that this hadith concerning Mut'ah refers to the Mut'ah of Hajj.

 wrote on his commentary of Al-Baqara, 196: 

Ibn Kathir thus believed that "The verse of Mut'ah" mentioned in the hadith refers to Al-Baqara, 196.

Shi'a view
Shi'a view this hadith as notable and important on several accounts, and often include it when discussing the hadith that related to Nikah Mut'ah.

They view that this verse confirms that Umar prohibited Nikah Mut'ah, and that the reason the Sahaba were not more vocal in their rejection of Umar's verdict was due to fear of life. This, in turn, is line with the Shi'a notion of Umar being responsible for a military Coup d'état during the Succession to Muhammad.

Shi'a notice the Sahaba Imran ibn Husain waited till his dying state before passing on what he knew of the subject, and in fact insisted that the one receiving the information would not pass it on in case he survived.

Shi'a also complain about the Sunni translator Muhammad Muhsin Khan translating the Arabic word "Mut'ah" that appears in the original text into English Mut'ah of Hajj, making it impossible to interpretation as Nikah Mut'ah.

Shi'a view that what is called "Verse of Mut'ah" is a reference to an-Nisa, 24.

References

See also
List of hadith

Nikah mut‘ah
Hadith